André Ralainasolo (born 11 June 1947) is a Malagasy sprinter. He competed in the men's 4 × 100 metres relay at the 1972 Summer Olympics.

References

1947 births
Living people
Athletes (track and field) at the 1972 Summer Olympics
Malagasy male sprinters
Olympic athletes of Madagascar
Place of birth missing (living people)